Trolla is a village in the municipality of Trondheim in Trøndelag county, Norway. It is located in the Midtbyen borough, along the Trondheimsfjord on the north coast of the Bymarka area.

References

Geography of Trondheim
Villages in Trøndelag